Damini Gowda (born 20 February 1999) is an Indian swimmer. She competed in the women's 100 metre butterfly event at the 2017 World Aquatics Championships. She also participated at the 2016 South Asian Games and won four gold medals.

References

External links
 

1999 births
Living people
Indian female swimmers
Place of birth missing (living people)
Female butterfly swimmers
South Asian Games gold medalists for India
South Asian Games medalists in swimming